Feng Chun-kai (born November 2, 1988) is a Taiwanese professional road and track cyclist, who currently rides for UCI WorldTeam . He represented his nation Taiwan, as a 19-year-old, at the 2008 Summer Olympics and later won numerous medals in track cycling, specifically in the men's points race and individual pursuit, at the Asian Championships. Feng has also claimed five Taiwanese national titles in road cycling, and a prestigious gold medal at the 2013 East Asian Games in Tianjin

Racing career
Feng was born in Miaoli County. Considered one of Taiwan's most promising cyclists in his generation, Feng sought headlines on the international scene as he outsprinted Japanese duo Kazuhiro Mori and defending champion Makoto Iijima for the gold medal in men's point race at the 2007 Asian Cycling Championships in Bangkok, Thailand.

Signifying an official start of his cycling career, Feng qualified for the Chinese Taipei squad in the men's points race at the 2008 Summer Olympics in Beijing by receiving a wild card invitation from the Union Cycliste Internationale (UCI). Feng dropped out of a grueling 25-km sprint race in a field of twenty-three cyclists after he slowed down his own pace on the track with only one extra lap needed to complete and a deduction of twenty points.

Feng slowly emerged as a solid, all-around road and track rider, when he earned his first ever Taiwanese national road race title in 2009, and eventually mounted a fifth-place finish at the East Asian Games. By the following year, he joined with the Action Cycling Team as a professional and signed for three seasons in an exclusive contract.

In 2011, Feng established a historic milestone in pro cycling as the first ever Asian rider to score three consecutive stage triumphs and grab the yellow jersey and a prestigious tournament title at the International Cycling Classic in the Midwest region of the United States.

While still competing for the Action Cycling Team on his final season in the road race, Feng redrafted his efforts to chase for another medal again in the track cycling scene. At the 2012 Asian Cycling Championships in Kuala Lumpur, Malaysia, Feng ended his five-year drought by edging out Thailand's Turakit Boonratanathanakorn and home favorite Harrif Saleh on a sprint ride for the gold in the men's elite  scratch race.

In early 2013, Feng joined his fellow Olympic riders Zachary Bell of Canada and Wu Kin San of Hong Kong for the  pro cycling team. Feng started his initial season by participating in the Tour de Taiwan, where he took top honors in the mountain classification to secure the jersey. Feng also reclaimed his fourth Taiwanese national road race title, and added the time trial title to his resume for the first time, since he won three straight championships from 2009 to 2011. In October 2013, Feng picked up his gold medal on the strength of an early lead in the men's road race at the East Asian Games in Tianjin, China.

In November 2014 Feng was announced as a signing for the  team for the 2015 season, becoming the first Taiwanese rider to race on the UCI World Tour.

Feng placed third in the 2019 Asian Road Cycling Championships, and qualified for the 2020 Summer Olympics. He became the first Taiwanese cyclist to qualify for the Olympic men's road cycling event since Chen Chih-hao in 1996.

Major results

2007
 1st  Points race, Asian Track Championships
2009
 1st  Road race, National Road Championships
 1st Stage 2 Giant Cup
 1st Stage 2 Tour of East Taiwan
 3rd  Individual pursuit, Asian Track Championships
 5th Road race, East Asian Games
2010
 1st  Road race, National Road Championships
 1st Overall Giant Cup
 2nd  Individual pursuit, Asian Track Championships
 7th Time trial, Asian Road Championships
 7th Overall Tour de Taiwan
 8th Overall Tour de East Java
 9th Individual pursuit, Asian Games
 9th Overall Tour de Hokkaido
 10th Overall Tour de Singkarak
2011
 1st  Road race, National Road Championships
 1st  Overall International Cycling Classic
1st Stages 1, 5 & 13
 3rd Taiwan Cup
 9th Overall Tour de Singkarak
2012
 1st  Mountains classification Tour de Filipinas
 1st  Mountains classification Tour of Fuzhou
 1st Stage 3 Giant Cup
 2nd  Scratch, Asian Track Championships
 3rd Overall Tour de Singkarak
 7th Overall Tour de Taiwan
1st  Mountains classification
 10th Road race, Asian Road Championships
2013
 1st  Road race, East Asian Games
 National Road Championships
1st  Road race
1st  Time trial
 1st  Mountains classification Tour de Taiwan
 1st Stage 1 Tour of East Taiwan
 7th Time trial, Asian Road Championships
2014
 National Road Championships
1st  Road race
1st  Time trial
 1st  Mountains classification Tour de Taiwan
 6th Overall Tour of Thailand
1st Stage 3
 8th Time trial, Asian Road Championships
 8th Overall Tour de East Java
 10th Road race, Asian Games
2015
 National Road Championships
1st  Road race
1st  Time trial
 9th Time trial, Asian Road Championships
2016
 Asian Road Championships
5th Road race
8th Time trial
2018
 3rd Tour de Okinawa
 5th Time trial, Asian Games
 Asian Road Championships
9th Road race
9th Time trial
2019
 1st  Time trial, National Road Championships
 Asian Road Championships
2nd  Time trial
3rd  Road race
 8th Tour de Okinawa
 9th Overall Tour de Taiwan
2020
 4th Overall Tour de Taiwan
1st  Asian rider classification
2021
 1st  Road race, National Road Championships
2022
 6th Overall Tour de Taiwan
1st Asian rider classification

References

External links

Player Bio – Team Champion System
NBC 2008 Olympics profile

1988 births
Living people
Taiwanese male cyclists
Taiwanese track cyclists
Cyclists at the 2008 Summer Olympics
Cyclists at the 2010 Asian Games
Cyclists at the 2014 Asian Games
Olympic cyclists of Taiwan
People from Miaoli County
Cyclists at the 2018 Asian Games
Asian Games competitors for Chinese Taipei
Cyclists at the 2020 Summer Olympics